Foolin' Around is a 1980 American comedy romance sport film directed by Richard T. Heffron and starring Gary Busey and Annette O'Toole.  The film was shot on location in Minneapolis and St. Paul. The theme music was performed by Seals and Crofts.

Plot
College student Wes (Gary Busey) who comes from Oklahoma to a university in Minnesota, signs up to participate in a psychological experiment where he meets Susan (Annette O'Toole). The two are instantly attracted to each other. Besides the problem of their differing socio-economic backgrounds, Susan is also engaged. However, Susan's grandfather recognizes her fiance's opportunism and when he sides with Wes, their relationship is given more of a chance, in spite of the concern Susan's mother has about social status.

Cast
 Gary Busey as Wes
 Annette O'Toole as Susan
 Cloris Leachman as Samantha
 William H. Macy as Bronski
 Tony Randall as Peddicord
 Michael Talbott as Clay
 Eddie Albert as Daggett
 John Calvin as Whitley
 Shirley Kane as Aunt Eunice
 Beth Bosacker as Rickie
 Roy Jenson as Blue
 Gene Lebell as Paul

Production
Susan's house, where Wes comes to play tennis and crashes her bridal shower, was the original Pillsbury family home called "Southways"—so named because one must go "south a ways" to reach this most singularly significant estate on Lake Minnetonka. The address is 1400 Bracketts Point Road, Orono, Minnesota. It is a large, 32,461 square foot home situated on 12.91 acres, built in 1918. 1,700 feet of lakeshore, cottage guest house, greenhouse, 13 garages, outdoor pool and tennis court, and attached tandem 4-car garage. It was listed for $54M, dropped to $24M, and dropped again to $7.9M, eventually selling for $11,327,239 in August 2018. The mansion was demolished one day after new owners closed on the property.

Critical reception
Janet Maslin of The New York Times gave the film a mixed review:

References

External links 

1980 films
1980 romantic comedy films
1980s coming-of-age comedy films
American coming-of-age comedy films
American romantic comedy films
Columbia Pictures films
Films directed by Richard T. Heffron
Films produced by Arnold Kopelson
Films scored by Charles Bernstein
Films set in Minnesota
Films set in universities and colleges
Films shot in Minnesota
1980s English-language films
1980s American films